John Clewarth (born 15 January 1948) is a former British cyclist. He competed in the individual road race and team time trial events at the 1972 Summer Olympics.

References

External links
 

1948 births
Living people
British male cyclists
Olympic cyclists of Great Britain
Cyclists at the 1972 Summer Olympics
Sportspeople from Liverpool